The 1985 IAAF World Cross Country Championships was held in Lisbon, Portugal, at the Sports Complex of Jamor on March 24, 1985.   A report on the event was given in the Glasgow Herald.

Complete results for men, junior men, women, medallists, 
 and the results of British athletes were published.

Medallists

Race results

Senior men's race (12.19 km)

Note: Athletes in parentheses did not score for the team result

Junior men's race (8.19 km)

Note: Athletes in parentheses did not score for the team result

Senior women's race (4.99 km)

Note: Athletes in parentheses did not score for the team result

Medal table (unofficial)

Note: Totals include both individual and team medals, with medals in the team competition counting as one medal.

Participation
An unofficial count yields the participation of 569 athletes from 50 countries, four athletes (2 senior men, 2 junior men) less than the official number published.

 (15)
 (6)
 (21)
 (15)
 (9)
 (21)
 (7)
 (7)
 (5)
 (18)
 (2)
 (21)
 (15)
 (9)
 (21)
 (17)
 (7)
 (10)
 (7)
 (3)
 (20)
 (2)
 (18)
 (7)
 (2)
 (14)
 (6)
 (12)
 (12)
 (13)
 (18)
 (3)
 (9)
 (4)
 (6)
 (21)
 (5)
 (1)
 (14)
 (21)
 (7)
 (21)
 (13)
 (12)
 (12)
 (1)
 (21)
 (20)
 (16)
 (3)

See also
 1985 IAAF World Cross Country Championships – Senior men's race
 1985 IAAF World Cross Country Championships – Junior men's race
 1985 IAAF World Cross Country Championships – Senior women's race
1985 in athletics (track and field)

References

External links
The World Cross Country Championships 1973-2005
GBRathletics
Athletics Australia

 
World Athletics Cross Country Championships
C
C
International athletics competitions hosted by Portugal
Sports competitions in Lisbon
Cross country running in Portugal
1980s in Lisbon
IAAF World Cross Country Championships